Gardan Taq (also Romanized as Gardan Ţāq; also known as Gardaneh Ţāqā and Takht-e Kāshān) is a village in Pian Rural District, in the Central District of Izeh County, Khuzestan Province, Iran. At the 2006 census, its population was 444, in 67 families.

References 

Populated places in Izeh County